The categorisation of the past into discrete, quantified named blocks of time is called periodization. This is a list of such named time periods as defined in various fields of study.

These can be divided broadly into prehistorical periods and historical periods (when written records began to be kept).

In archaeology and anthropology, prehistory is subdivided around the three-age system, this list includes the use of the three-age system as well as a number of various designation used in reference to sub-ages within the traditional three.

The dates for each age can vary by region. On the geologic time scale, the Holocene epoch starts at the end of the last glacial period of the current ice age (c. 10,000 BCE) and continues to the present. The beginning of the Mesolithic is usually considered to correspond to the beginning of the Holocene epoch.

General periods 

 Prehistory – Period between the appearance of Homo ("humans"; first stone tools c. three million years ago) and the invention of writing systems (for the Ancient Near East: c. five thousand years ago).
Paleolithic – the earliest period of the Stone Age 
Lower Paleolithic – time of archaic human species, predates Homo sapiens
Middle Paleolithic – coexistence of archaic and anatomically modern human species
Upper Paleolithic – worldwide expansion of anatomically modern humans, the disappearance of archaic humans by extinction or admixture with modern humans; earliest evidence for pictorial art.
 Mesolithic (Epipaleolithic) – a period in the development of human technology between the Palaeolithic and Neolithic periods.
 Neolithic – a period of primitive technological and social development, beginning about 10,200 BCE in parts of the Middle East, and later in other parts of the world.
 Chalcolithic (or "Eneolithic", "Copper Age") – still largely Neolithic in character, where early copper metallurgy appeared alongside the use of stone tools.
 Bronze Age – not part of prehistory for all regions and civilizations who had adopted or developed a writing system.
 Iron Age – not part of prehistory for all civilizations who had introduced written records during the Bronze Age.
 Protohistory – period between prehistory and history, during which a culture or civilization has not yet developed writing but other cultures have already noted its existence in their own writings; the absolute timescale of "protohistory" varies widely depending on the region, from the late 4th millennium BCE in the Ancient Near East to the present in the case of uncontacted peoples.
 Ancient history – Aggregate of past events from the beginning of recorded human history and extending as far as the Early Middle Ages or the Postclassical Era. The span of recorded history is roughly five thousand years, beginning with the earliest linguistic records in the third millennium BCE in Mesopotamia and Egypt.
Classical antiquity – Broad term for a long period of cultural history centered on the Mediterranean Sea, comprising the interlocking civilizations of ancient Greece and ancient Rome, collectively known as the Greco-Roman world. It is the period in which Greek and Roman society flourished and wielded great influence throughout Europe, North Africa and the Middle East.
 Post-classical history – Period of time that immediately followed ancient history. Depending on the continent, the era generally falls between the years CE 200–600 and CE 1200–1500. The major classical civilizations that the era follows are Han China (ending in 220), the Western Roman Empire (in 476), the Gupta Empire (in the 550s), and the Sasanian Empire (in 651). 
 Middle Ages – Lasted from the 5th to the 15th century. It began with the collapse of the Western Roman Empire in 476 and is variously demarcated by historians as ending with the Fall of Constantinople in 1453, or the discovering of America by Columbus in 1492, merging into the Renaissance and the Age of Discovery.
 Early Middle Ages (also called Dark Ages)
 High Middle Ages
 Late Middle Ages
 Modern history – After the post-classical era
Early modern period – The chronological limits of this period are open to debate. It emerges from the Late Middle Ages (c. 1500), demarcated by historians as beginning with the fall of Constantinople in 1453, in forms such as the Italian Renaissance in the West, the Ming dynasty in the East, and the rise of the Aztecs in the New World. The period ends with the beginning of the Age of Revolutions.
 Late modern period – Began approximately in the mid-18th century; notable historical milestones included the French Revolution, the American Revolution, the Industrial Revolution and the Great Divergence
 Contemporary history – History within living memory. It shifts forward with the generations, and today is the span of historic events from approximately 1945 that are immediately relevant to the present time.

Sociological periods 
Only for late modern contemporary history.

 Nineteen-twenties (1920–1929)
 Roaring Twenties
 Nineteen-thirties (1930–1939)
 Nineteen-forties (1940–1949)
 Nineteen-fifties (1950–1959)
 Nineteen-sixties (1960–1969)
 Nineteen-seventies (1970–1979)
 Nineteen-eighties (1980–1989)
 Nineteen-nineties (1990–1999)
 Two-thousands (2000–2009)
 Twenty-tens (2010–2019)
 Twenty-twenties (2020–2029)
 Twenty-thirties (2030─2039)
 Twenty-forties (2040─2049)
 Twenty-fifties (2050─2059)
 Twenty-sixties (2060─2069)
 Twenty-seventies (2070─2079)
 Twenty-eighties (2080─2089)
 Twenty-nineties (2090─2099)

Technological periods 
 Prehistory
 Paleolithic (Lower, Middle, Upper)
 Mesolithic (Epipaleolithic)
 Neolithic
 Chalcolithic (or "Eneolithic", "Copper Age")
 Ancient history (The Bronze and Iron Ages are not part of prehistory for all regions and civilizations who had adopted or developed a writing system.)
 Bronze Age
 Iron Age
 Late Middle Ages
 Renaissance
 Early modern history
 Modern history
 Industrial Age (1760─1970)
 Machine Age (1880–1945)
 Age of Oil (1901–present)
 Jet Age (1940s)
 Nuclear Age (a.k.a. Atomic Era) (1945/1950–present) 
 Space Age (1957–present)
 Information Age (1970–present)
 The Social Age (1996–2022)
 The Age of AI (2022 - )

American periods 

 Classic and Postclassic eras, Central America (200–1519)
 Early Intermediate, Middle Horizon, Late Intermediate, Late Horizon (Peru, 200–1534)
 Huari, Chimú, Chincha, Chanka people, Tiwanaku, Inca
 Baroque (New World, 1600–1750)
 Spanish hegemony (Americas, 1492 – 1832)
 Reconstruction era (the United States, 1865–1877) (Some of this time period is known as the “Old West”)
 Gilded Age (the United States, 1875–1900)
 Progressive Era (the United States, the 1890s–1920s)
 Jazz Age (the United States, the 1920s–1930s)
 Information Age (United States, 1970–present)
 Modern age
 Postmodern age

Australian periods 

 Ancient Australia, First Nations (between 50,000 and 65,000 BCE – 1788 CE)
 Age of Discovery, European maritime exploration of Australia (1606–1802)
 Convict era, (1788–1868)
 Victorian era, (1837–1901)
 Federation era, (1890–1918)
 World War II, (1939–1945)
 Second Elizabethan era, (1952–2022)

Southeast Asian periods 

 Srivijaya (Indonesia, 3rd – 14th centuries), Tarumanagara (358–723), Sailendra (8th and 9th centuries), Kingdom of Sunda (669–1579), Kingdom of Mataram (752–1045), Kediri (1045–1221), Singhasari (1222–1292), Majapahit (1293–1500)
 Chenla (Cambodia, 630 – 802) and Khmer Empire (Cambodia, 802–1432)
 Anterior Lý dynasty and Triệu Việt Vương, Third Chinese domination, Khúc Family, Dương Đình Nghệ, Kiều Công Tiễn, Ngô dynasty, The 12 Lords Rebellion, Đinh dynasty, Prior Lê dynasty, Lý dynasty, Trần dynasty, Hồ dynasty, Fourth Chinese domination (Vietnam, 544–1427)

Filipino periods 

 Neolithic–Iron Age (c. 10,000 BCE–900 CE)
 Archaic period (900 CE–1521)
 Spanish period (1521–1898)
 American period (1898–1946)
 Third Republic (1946–1972)
 Marcos era (1972–1986)
 Fifth Republic (1986–present)

Chinese periods 

 Three Sovereigns and Five Emperors (2852–2070 BCE)
 Xia dynasty (2070–1600 BCE)
 Shang dynasty (1600–1046 BCE)
 Zhou dynasty (1046–221 BCE)
 Western Zhou (1046–771 BCE)
 Eastern Zhou (771–221 BCE)
 Spring and Autumn period (771–476 BCE)
 Warring States period (476–221 BCE)
 Qin dynasty (221–206 BCE)
 Han dynasty (206 BCE – 220 CE)
 Western Han (206 BCE – 2 CE)
 Xin dynasty (9–23 CE)
 Eastern Han (25–220 CE)
 Six Dynasties (220–580)
 Three Kingdoms (220–265)
 Jin dynasty (266–420)
 Southern and Northern Dynasties (420–580)
 Sui dynasty (580–618)
 Tang dynasty (623–907)
 Five Dynasties and Ten Kingdoms period (907–960)
 Song dynasty (960–1279)
 Northern Song (960–1127), Liao dynasty (907–1115)
 Western Xia dynasty (1038–1227)
 Southern Song (1127–1279), Jin dynasty (1115–1234)
 Yuan dynasty (1271–1368)
 Ming dynasty (1368–1644)
 Qing dynasty (1644–1911)
 Republic of China (1912–1949)
 Xinhai Revolution (1911–1912)
 Warlord Era (1918–1927)
 Chinese Civil War (1927-1936/1946-1950)
 Second Sino-Japanese War (1937–1945)
 People's Republic of China and Taiwan (1949–present)

Central Asian periods 

 Xiongnu (Mongolia, 220 BCE – CE 200)
 Rouran Khaganate (Mongolia, Manchuria, Xianbei, CE 330 – 555)
 Sixteen Kingdoms (Xianbei, Turkic peoples, 304 – 439)
 Uyghur Khaganate (Mongolia, Manchuria, Tibet, 744 – 848)
 Liao dynasty (Khitan people, 907 – 1125)
 Mongol Empire (Mongolia, 1206 – 1380)
 Qing dynasty (Manchu China, 1692 – 1911)

Egyptian periods 

 Prehistoric Egypt (pre-3150 BCE)
 Early Dynastic Period or Archaic Period (two dynasties) (3150 BCE – 2686 BCE)
 Old Kingdom (four dynasties) (2686 BCE – 2181 BCE)
 First Intermediate Period (four dynasties) (2181 BCE – 2055 BCE)
 Middle Kingdom (three dynasties) (2055 BCE – 1650 BCE)
 Second Intermediate Period (four dynasties) (1650 BCE – 1550 BCE)
 New Kingdom (three dynasties) (1550 BCE – 1069 BCE)
 Third Intermediate Period (five dynasties) (1069 BCE – 664 BCE)
 Late Period of Ancient Egypt (six dynasties: of these six, two were Persian dynasties that ruled from capitals distant from Egypt) (664 BCE – c. 332 BCE)
 Argead and Ptolemaic dynasties (332 BCE – 30 BCE)
 Aegyptus (fifteen Roman dynasties that ruled from capitals distant from Egypt) (30 BCE – 641 CE)
 Sasanian Egypt (one dynasty) (619-629)
 Coptic period (300 CE – 900 CE)
 Egypt under four foreign Arabic dynasties that ruled from capitals distant from Egypt
 Rashidun Egypt (641–661)
 Umayyad Egypt	(661–750)
 Abbasid Egypt	(750–868 and 905–935)
 Tulunid dynasty	(868–905)
 Ikhshidid dynasty (935–969)
 Fatimid dynasty (969–1171)
 Ayyubid dynasty (1171–1250)
 Mamluk dynasties (1250–1517)
 Bahri dynasty (1250–1382)
 Burji dynasty (1382–1517)
 Ottoman Egypt (Turk dynasty that ruled from a capital distant from Egypt) (1517–1867)
 Muhammad Ali dynasty (1805-1953)
 Khedivate (1867–1914)
 Sultanate of Egypt (1914–1922)
 Kingdom of Egypt	(1922–1953)
 Republican Egypt (1953–present)

European periods 

 Bronze Age (c. 3000 BCE – c. 1050 BCE)
 Early Aegean Civilization (Crete, Greece and Near East; c. 3000 BCE – c. 1050 BCE)
 Iron Age (c. 1050 BCE – c. 500 CE)
 Greek expansion and colonization (c. 1050 BCE – 776 BCE)
 Archaic Greece (776 BCE – 480 BCE) – begins with the First Olympiad, traditionally dated 776 BCE
 Archaic period (776 BCE – 612 BCE) – the establishment of city-states in Greece
 Pre-classical period (612 BCE – 480 BCE) – the fall of Nineveh to the second Persian invasion of Greece
 Classical antiquity (480 BCE – 476 CE)
 Classical Greece (480 BCE – 338 BCE)
 Macedonian era (338 BCE – 323 BCE)
 Hellenistic Greece (323 BCE – 146 BCE)
 Late Roman Republic (147 BCE – 27 BCE)
 Principate of the Roman Empire (27 BCE – 284 CE)
 Late Antiquity (284 CE – 500 CE)
 Migration Period (Europe, 300 CE – 700 CE)
 Middle Ages (Europe, 476–1453)
 Byzantine era (330–1453)
 Early Middle Ages (Europe, 476–1066)
 Viking Age (Scandinavia, Europe, 793–1066)
 High Middle Ages (Europe, 1066 – c. 1300)
 Late Middle Ages (Europe, c. 1300 – 1453)
 The Renaissance (Europe, c. 1300 – c. 1601)
 Early modern period (Europe, 1453–1789)
 Age of Discovery (or Exploration) (Europe, c. 1400 – 1770)
 Polish Golden Age (Poland, 1507–1572)
 Golden Age of Piracy (1650–1730)
 Tudor period (England, 1485–1603)
 Elizabethan era (England, 1558–1603)
 Stuart period (British Isles,  1603–1714)
 Jacobean era (British Isles, 1603–1625) 
 Caroline era (British Isles, 1625 – 1649)
 British Interregnum (British  Isles, 1649-1660)
 Stuart Restoration (British Isles, 1660-1714)
 Carolean era (British Isles, 1660-1685)
 Protestant Reformation (Europe, 16th century)
 Classicism (Europe, 16th – 18th centuries)
 Industrious Revolution, (Europe, 16th – 18th centuries)
 Petrine Era (Russia, 1689–1725)
 Age of Enlightenment (or Reason) (Europe, 18th century)
 Scientific Revolution (Europe, 18th century)
 Long nineteenth century (1789–1914)
 Georgian era (the United Kingdom, 1714–1830)
 Industrial Revolution (Europe, United States, elsewhere 18th and 19th centuries)
 Age of European colonialism and imperialism
 Romantic era (1770–1850)
 Napoleonic era (1799–1815)
 Victorian era (the United Kingdom, 1837–1901); British hegemony (1815-1914) much of world, around the same time period.
 Edwardian era (the United Kingdom, 1901–1914)
 First, interwar period and Second World Wars (1914–1945)
 Interwar Britain (United Kingdom, 1918-1939)
 Cold War (1945–1991)
 Post-Cold War / Postmodernity (1991–present)

Iranian periods 

Prehistoric Iran

Ancient age:
 Achaemenid Empire (550 –330 BCE)
 Greek occupation of Persia (330 –312 BCE): 
 Seleucid Empire (312 – 63 BCE)
 Parthian Empire (247 BCE – 224 AD)
 Sassanid Empire (224 – 651 AD)

Medieval age:
 Persia under Caliphates (651 – 820 AD)
 Iranian Intermezzo (c.820 –1037): Tahirids (821 to 873), Saffarids (861 to 1003), Samanids (819 to 999) and Buyids (934 to 1062)
 Seljuk Empire (1037–1194) 
 Khwarazmian Empire (1194 –1219) 
 Mongol occupation of Persia (1219 –1256) 
 Ilkhanate (1256–1335) 
 Disintegration of the Ilkhanate (1335–1370): Jalayirids, Chobanids, Muzaffarids, Injuids, Sarbadars, and Kartids
 Timurid Empire (1370 –1507) and Aq Qoyunlu (1378 –1501)

Modern age:
 Safavid Iran (1501 –1736) 
 Afsharid Iran (1736 –c.1750)
 Zand Iran (1750–1794) 
 Qajar Iran (1794–1925)
 Pahlavi Iran (1925–1979)
 Islamic Republic of Iran (1979–present)

Indian periods 

 South Asian Stone Age
 South Asian Bronze Age (3340 BCE – 1350 BCE)
 Indus Valley civilization
 South Asian Iron Age (1350 BCE – 200 BCE) 
 Vedic period (1350 BCE – 500 BCE): Mahajanapadas 
 Magadha period (c.500 BCE – c.750 CE): Nandas, Mauryans, Shungas 
 Classical Age in India (200 BCE – 500 CE)
 Sangam period (300 BCE – 600 CE): Cholas, Chalukyas, Pallavas and Pandyans
 Golden period: Kushans (50 CE – 220 CE), Satavahanas (230 BCE – 220 CE), Guptas (320 CE – 535 CE) and Vakatakas (300CE – 650 CE)
 Medieval Age in India (500–1526)
 Tripartite period (c.750 – c.900): Palas, Rashtrakutas and Gurjaras
 Muslim period (712 – 1857): Delhi, Bengal, Bahmani and Gujarat sultanates
 Vijayanagara empire (1336 – 1646), Gajapati empire (1434 – 1541) and kingdom of Mewar (1325 – 1448)
 Modern Age in India (1526 – present)
 Mughal empire (1526 – 1857)
 Maratha empire (1674 – 1818)
 Colonial period: British Raj (1858 – 1947)
 Independence (1947 – present)

Japanese periods 

 Jōmon period (10,501 BCE – 400 BCE)
 Yayoi period (450 BCE – 250 CE)
 Kofun period (250–600)
 Asuka period (643–710)
 Nara period (743–794)
 Heian period (795–1185)
 Kamakura period (1185–1333)
 Muromachi period (1333–1573)
 Azuchi–Momoyama period (1573–1603)
 Edo period (1603–1868)
 Meiji period (1868–1912)
 Taishō period (1912–1926)
 Shōwa period (1926–1989)
 Post-occupation era (1952 – present)
 Heisei period (1989–2019)
 Reiwa period (2019–present)

West Asian periods 

 Mesopotamia
 Samarra culture
 Hassuna culture
 Halaf-Ubaid Transitional period
 Ubaid period
 Uruk period
 Jemdet Nasr period (3100 BCE – 2900 BCE)
 Early Dynastic Period (2900 BCE – 2270 BCE)
 Akkadian Empire (2270 BCE – 2083 BCE)
 Gutian dynasty (2083 BCE – 2050 BCE)
 Ur III period (2050 BCE – 1940 BCE)
 First Babylonian dynasty (1830 BCE – 1531 BCE), Hittites (1800 BCE – 1178 BCE)
 Kassites (1531 BCE – 1135 BCE), Mitanni (1500 BCE – 1300 BCE)
 Neo-Assyrian Empire (934 BCE – 609 BCE)
 Neo-Babylonian Empire (626 BCE – 539 BCE), Medes (678 BCE – 549 BCE)
 Persian Empires (550 BCE – 651 CE)
 Achaemenid Empire (550 BCE – 330 BCE)
 Conquered by Macedonian Empire (330 BCE – 312 BCE)
 Seleucid Empire (312 BCE – 63 BCE)
 Parthian Empire (247 BCE – 224 CE)
 Sasanian Empire (224 CE – 651 CE)
 Islamicate periods (7th – 21st centuries)
 High Caliphate (685–945)
 Earlier Middle Period (945–1250)
 Later Middle Period (1250–1500)
 Rashidun Caliphate (632–661)
 Umayyad Caliphate (661–750)
 Abbasid Caliphate (750–1258), Fatimid Caliphate (909–1171)
 Buyid dynasty (934–1055)
 Seljuq dynasty (1055–1171)
 Ayyubid dynasty (1171–1341)
 Ottoman Empire (1300–1923), Safavid Empire (1501–1736)

See also 
 Art of Europe
 Geologic time scale
 List of fossil sites with link directory.
 List of timelines around the world.
 Logarithmic timeline shows all history on one page in ten lines.
 Periodization for a discussion of the tendency to try to fit history into non-overlapping periods.

References

Citations

Sources cited 

 

History
Historical timelines
History-related lists